Felix Oscar Schlag (September 4, 1891 – March 9, 1974) was a German born American sculptor who was the designer of the United States five cent coin in use from 1938 to 2004.

He was born to Karl and Teresa Schlag in Frankfurt, Germany where as a young man, he served in the German army of World War I. Schlag studied sculpture at the Academy of Fine Arts, Munich.  He moved to the United States in 1929.

On April 21, 1938, Schlag's design for the Jefferson nickel was selected by Nellie Tayloe Ross, Director of the United States Mint. Schlag won $1,000 for his winning design of the coin; he had been an award-winning artist in Europe. His prize money was spent on his wife's funeral. In the 1930s, Felix won several sculptural commissions and art prizes including some New Deal commissions to produce work at several post offices, including ones in White Hall, Illinois and schools in Champaign, Illinois and Bloom Township.

Schlag accepted the offer of the American government to place his initials, FS, on the nickel beginning in 1966.

The designer relocated to Owosso, Michigan, where he died and is buried. He and his wife Anna, whom he married in 1920, had three children: Feliza (1920), Leo (1921), and Hilda (1929). A memorial was placed by the Michigan State Numismatic Society on September 14, 2008.

Notes

External links 
 

1891 births
1974 deaths
German emigrants to the United States
Artists from Frankfurt
People from Owosso, Michigan
American currency designers
20th-century American sculptors
20th-century American male artists
American male sculptors
Coin designers